Hayfield is an unincorporated community and census-designated place in Hancock County, Iowa, United States. As of the 2010 census the population was 43.

Demographics

History
Hayfield was platted in 1891. Hayfield's population was 40 in 1902.

Education
Hayfield is a part of the Garner–Hayfield–Ventura Community School District. It was previously in the Garner–Hayfield Community School District, which merged into the current GHV district on July 1, 2015.

References

Census-designated places in Iowa
Census-designated places in Hancock County, Iowa